Suman Kabiraj (born 1983, Suri Suri, Birbhum West Bengal) is an Indian contemporary artist . He lives and works in Kolkata ,India. Kabiraj's work includes drawing, painting, installation, video art and new media art. He is awarded with Gaganendranath Taagore Memorial Award from  Indian Society of Oriental Art, Governor's Gold Medal from Government College of Art & Craft,Kalanand Gold award from Prafulla Dahanukar Art Foundation, Mumbai.He is recipient of National Award from Camel Art Foundation, India and received 'Pandemic as Portal Grant'  by Badam Tree in association with 1 Shanthi Road Bangalore . He is represented in different art shows,art events and art fairs globally.He took an important part in the documentary film 'Mind and Canvas', produced by Films Division of India.

Education 

Suman Kabiraj received his Master of Fine Arts (in 2006–2007)and Bachelor of Fine Arts (in 2004) degrees in painting from Government College of Art & Craft   affiliated to University of Calcutta.Also he received a sponsored art educational tour to Europe(by Camel Art Foundation)while he was studying Masters (MFA) .

Awards and Scholarships 
Suman Kabiraj is honoured with different awards and grants from different organisations, few of them are (2021)'Pandemic as Portal Grant' by Badam Tree in association with 1 Shanthiroad Bangalore, (2017)Kalanand Gold award from Prafulla Dahnukar Art Foundation, Mumbai for Drawing, (2016) Kalanand Bronze  Award from Prafulla Dahnukar Art Foundation, Mumbai for Installation work, (2005) National Award in 5th Camlin Art Exhibition and Professional Visit to London and Paris by Camlin India Art Foundation, (2004) Governor's Gold  Medal  from  Govt.  College  of  Art  &  Crafts  for  the  best  exhibit  in The Annual Exhibition, (2004) Award in  5th  Camlin  Eastern  Region  Art  Exhibition, (2004 )Award  in Bengal Talent Search Organization, (2003) Sunil Das Scholarship from Govt. College of Art & Craft, (2003) Mukul Dey Award for Graphic  Art from Govt.College of Art & Craft, (2002) Gopen Roy memorial Award from Indian Society of Oriental Art, Kolkata, (2002 ) Rashbehari Dutta Memorial Scholarship from Govt.College of Art &  Craft, Kolkata, (2001)Gaganendra Nath Tagore Memorial Award from Indian Society of Oriental Art,   (2001) Award in 2nd Camlin Eastern Region Art Exhibition,  Kolkata.

Career 
Having received his BFA in painting in 2004 kabiraj mounted his first large format solo show titled ' A Journey through Images ' in Academy of Fine Arts, Kolkata. this show was his homage to few important personalities and their contribution to Indian history.In few years Suman explored his mediums and produced a body of works .Suman Kabiraj has a multidisciplinary practice as an artist. His artistic practice  explores subversive and comment on the human condition, social stories,nature and ecology. In his works he uses variety of media including painting, drawing, video art ,installation and multimedia works .Most of his subjects are familiar but recontextualized. This works appear in terms of their insight, interest and coherence complexity. Probably it's because contemporary frames of society and stories from the real ground do appeal.

He has exhibited in numerous prestigious group shows and solo shows in India and abroad.

Participation in Art Shows and Art Fairs 
(2023) Participated in Versopolis Expo'23 as new media artist in Ljubljana Slovenia.  (2022) Participated in International show 'What Democracy Means to Me ' in American Centre New Delhi in association with the Kutumb Foundation, Art for Change and  Kiran Nadar Museum of Art.  (2022) Participated in Annual Pasa Art Festival in Seoul, Korea.  (2022) Participated in International Video Art Screening "D-Construction" by Grosso Modo Artists Collective in Jaffa Israel.  (2022) Participated in BIVAF, 16th Busan International Video Art Festival.  (2022) Participated in CIMA Art Fair. (2021)Participated in 'Three artists moving image show' at Fountain Street Art Gallery, Boston  .(2021) Participated in International new media art presentation, titled "The Sidewalk Inside" at Boston Center for the Arts and Plaza Theatre. (2021) "Framing Infection" an international online art project by Badam Tree in association with 1Shanthiroad Studio/Gallery, Bangalore.  (2021)Selected in Florence Biennale, Florence Italy.  (2021) Represented in online project by Gujral Foundation, New Delhi.  (2020) ' We Are In This Together 'International Online Art Project by Goethe Institut New Delhi.  (2020) Represented in Patchlab Digital Art Festival, Krakow, Poland supported by Goethe institute and The University of Auckland.  (2020) Virtual Residency on Lockdown works project by Emptyroom Art, Mozambique, South Africa .(2020)Taiwan International New Media Festival .  (2020)  'Art under lockdown' by Counterweave Arts, Rome Italy curated by Felicity Griffin Clark.  (2020) 'COVID19 Creative Outlet' by Ideasblock art gallery, Vilnius Lithuania.  (2020)'BITE' an international art project preview by Shanghai Contemporary Matters Co.Ltd.   (2020) 'The Situation Room 2020' international art project by Kala Chaupal India. (2019) Group Show curated by Reena Dewan at Kolkata Centre for Creativity. (2019)  Reflection of Another Day - Contemporary Group Art Show at Birla Academy of Art and Culture.  (2018) 'Revisiting 42 ' a curated group art show on 1942 Indian movement by RAD, Kolkata.  (2017)Jaipur Art Summit for installation work,  (2017)CIMA Awards Show for site specific Installation work.  (2017, 2016 )National Contemporary Art Exhibition, Mumbai, organized by Prafulla Foundation. (2016 ) National Art Workshop at Calcutta Rowing Club.  (2015) ‘Aalborg Surreal-3’ International Group Show at Aalborg, Denmark organized by ‘European   Youth Organization and Lete.   (2015)  ‘Walk on the Line, Art project at Environmental Art Kolkata curated by Manas Acharya.   ( 2015 )  Espacio Enter- Japan Media Art Festival . ( 2017 )‘CIMA Award Show at Centre of International Modern Art (CIMA), Kolkata,  (2015) ‘ Giving for an Assortment’ - group show at Emami Chisel Art Gallery. (2014)' Summer Show (2014) ' Centre of International Modern Art (CIMA), Kolkata. ( 2014 )Netherlands Streaming Festival for Audio Visual art, United Kingdom,  (2014 )Meme Art Fest Imagination (2014)at   Ljubljana, Slovenia, ( 2014 )‘Papyrus’ paper work show, curated by Ushmita Sahoo at Gallery M, Kolkata .  (2013)Espacio Enter Europe International Art Preview. (2013 ) ‘Liquid Cities & Temporary Identities’ international exhibition, Espoo (Finland). (2013)  Belfast International Festival, Catalyst Art Gallery,United Kingdom. (2012) Stigmart /10 Europe International Annual Previews. (2011) Indian Contemporary Art Show, National Gallery, Jakarta, Indonesia.( 2010 ) Contemporary Painting Show organized by Kolkata Museum Society, Kolkata Town Hall .(2009)Workshop and group show organized by Emami Chisel Art Pvt.ltd..kolkata. (2005–2013)   Annual Exhibition of Birla Academy Of Art and Culture, Kolkata. (2008 )  ' Zen Next-111 ' International Art Show at  Aakriti art gallery, Kolkata.( 2008) ' Face Of Bengal ‘curated group show, Kolkata.  (2008)' TEN MEN Show ' at Art Space India organized by gallery Exposure,Kolkata,   (2007) ' YOUNG CONTEMPORARIES ' organized by  Aakriti  art  gallery,  curated  by Shri  Jogen  Chowdhury,  Kolkata.  (2007) Indian artists’ group show, Organized by Birla Academy of Art and Culture, Kolkata,  (2007) All India fine arts & crafts society, annual Exhibition ( AIFACS New Delhi.  (2007) ' Project organized by ' KHOJ ' and ' BALVIVIDHA ' at Birla  Institute of  Technology  and  Museum,  Kolkata. ( 2006)'ART WATCH ' -trends and  talents of India today- Group  Show  organized by  Gallery  88,  Kolkata.  ( 2005)Art Workshops at  Kolkata Information Centre organized by Govt. of WestBengal.   (2004 )5th Camlin Eastern Region Art Exhibition, (Professional  Category). ( 2003) ' A New Vision Of Art ' Group  Show, at Karnataka  chitrakala  parishath, Bangalore. (2000–02 ) Annual Exhibition of Information Centre, Kolkata. ( 2000–03)  Annual Exhibition of Indian Society of Oriental Art, Kolkata.  (1999-04) Annual  Exhi Govt. College of Art and Craft, Kolkata.

References 

 

 

3.

1983 births
Living people
Artists from West Bengal